Glenn Everett Riggs (July 24, 1907 – September 12, 1975) was an American radio announcer.

Early years 
Riggs was the youngest of two children born to parents Edwin E. (April 15, 1874–August 1, 1968) and Pearl Riggs on July 24, 1907 in East McKeesport, Pennsylvania. He had an older sister named Cora Corley (1904-1991).

Career 
Riggs' voice could be heard on various radio programs throughout the 1930s, 1940s, and 1950s. Some of those radio programs included Vic and Sade, The Adventures of Jungle Jim, The Three R's, Hop Harrigan, Ethel and Albert, Boston Blackie, and Philco Radio Time.

Riggs was also famous for being the announcer for Bing Crosby for more than a decade.

In 1958, Riggs was an announcer on the game show Make Me Laugh.

Recordings
In 1957, Riggs and Paul Wing recorded Peter Rabbitt, Goldilocks and Other Great Tales for Growing Boys and Girls (RCA Victor LBY 1001).

Death 
Riggs and his wife Elizabeth are buried at Memorial Cemetery of Saint John's Church in Laurel Hollow, New York.

References

External links

1907 births
1975 deaths
American male radio actors
20th-century American male actors